The Italian community of Australia has played an influential role in the history of Australian soccer. Numerous clubs have been formed over the years in every state and territory, where present there are at least thirty active Italian football clubs competing in official senior competitions.

History
The first Italian football/sporting club founded in Australia was Charlestown City Blues FC, which was founded in 1900, that is also the current oldest surviving club. Numerous clubs took various types of inspirations from professional clubs in Italy. It has officially been acknowledged that five clubs took inspiration from Juventus, and another two from AC Milan and US Triestina.

It is debated regarding which club is the most successful and has the largest following. Marconi Stallions FC leads in the most National Soccer League championships, being equal first in the league total. Adelaide City FC acquired the most NSL Cups, and is the only Italian club to have become a continental champion, winning the OFC Champions League in 1987. Overall, the Italian clubs produced a total of nine national championships, seven national cups, one continental cup, and various state championships and cups respectively.

National Soccer League participants

The following list of clubs participated in the defunct National Soccer League, which was at its time the highest level of soccer in Australia. A total of seven clubs from four states participated, producing a total of nine championships, seven cups and one continental championship, during the league's existence.

Clubs by state/territory

Australian Capital Territory

New South Wales

Northern Territory

Queensland

South Australia

Tasmania

Victoria

Western Australia

See also

Italian Australian
List of sports clubs inspired by others
List of Croatian soccer clubs in Australia
List of Greek Soccer clubs in Australia
List of Serbian soccer clubs in Australia

References

 
Italian-Australian culture
Italy
Australia

Italian-Australian backed sports clubs
Italian
Italian Soccer clubs